The Gift is the fourth studio album by American rapper Big Mello from Houston, Texas. It was released on July 29, 2002 via small record label KMJ Records. This album is considered one of Big Mello's greatest achievements. It was his first posthumous album as well as his first album after a long hiatus. The song "Miss My Niggas" is dedicated to Mello's late friend Sheldon.

Track listing

Personnel
Curtis Donnell Davis – main artist, vocals, producer
Quincy "Q-Stone" Whetstone – producer
James Hoover – mixing
John Moran – mastering

References

External links

2002 albums
Big Mello albums
Albums published posthumously